New York's 55th State Senate district is one of 63 districts in the New York State Senate. It has been represented by  Democrat Samra Brouk since 2021, succeeding Republican Rich Funke.

Geography
District 55 covers parts of Monroe and Ontario Counties, including the eastern half of Rochester and many of its eastern and northern suburbs.

The district overlaps with New York's 25th congressional district and with the 131st, 133rd, 135th, 136th, 137th, and 138th districts of the New York State Assembly.

Recent election results

2020

2018

2016

2014

2012

Federal results in District 55

References

55